The Thicket is the second album by David Grubbs, released on September 15, 1998 through Drag City.

Track listing

Personnel 
Musicians
Joshua Abrams – bass guitar
Jeb Bishop – trombone
Tony Conrad – violin
David Grubbs – guitar
Ernst Karel – trumpet, flugelhorn
John McEntire – drums, percussion
Mary Lass Stewart – vocals
Production and additional personnel
Phil Bonnet – recording
Renaud Monfourny – photography
Stephen Prina – cover art

References

External links 
 

1998 albums
David Grubbs albums
Drag City (record label) albums